Mangalashtak Once More is a 2013 Indian romantic musical comedy film directed by Sameer Joshi, and produced by Renu Desai under the banner of Shree Aadhya Films.

The film features Swwapnil Joshi and Mukta Barve in lead roles; it is the third collaboration between Joshi and Barve after Eka Lagnachi Dusri Goshta (2012) and also stars Sai Tamhankar and Kadambari Kadam in supporting roles. The film is about Aarti and Satyajit who are happily married, but after a certain while because of Aarti's over caring behaviour, Satyajit feels suffocated and they part ways.

The soundtrack and background score were composed by Nilesh Moharir while the cinematography and editing were handled Sanjay Jadhav and Suchitra Sathe  respectively. The film was released on 22 November 2013.

Story
The film spins around the spouse wife relationship in cutting edge times. Satyajeet and Aarti are hitched for a few years. With time the enchantment in their relationship appears to be lost. Satyajeet feels choked in the relationship as a result of Aarti's over-minding nature. The film demonstrates how they both attempt their best to make things work and how they see every others position in the relationship.

Cast
Swwapnil Joshi as Satyajeet Pathak
Mukta Barve as Aarti Pathak
Sai Tamhankar as Shalini
Kadambari Kadam as Reva
Hemant Dhome
Vijay Patwardhan
Vijay Pushkar

Soundtrack 
1.Divas Olya pakalyanche
2.Usavale dhaage

References

External links
 

2010s Marathi-language films